Mandhana is a town in the Kanpur district of the Indian state of Uttar Pradesh, situated about  from Kanpur on the Grand Trunk Road to Delhi. , the town had 213 households with a population of 993 of which 504 were male and 489 female. It also falls within the Kanpur metropolitan area. The language commonly spoken is Hindi with accent and tone of Kannauji. The IIT Kanpur is just 7 kilometres from Mandhana and also houses some of the successful alumnus of the institute. Mandhana is also known for private institutes like Maharana Pratap Engineering College and Rama University.

Travel
Mandhana has a bus station on National Highway 91 (Grand Trunk Road) and buses for Kanpur, Kannauj, Ghaziabad, Allahabad and Fatehpur are easily available. The UPSRTC city buses of Kanpur Metropolitan Bus Service have routes from Mandhana to different localities and cities within Kanpur Metropolitan Area. Mandhana has a railway station on the Kanpur-Farrukhabad line with an additional railway line to Bithoor railway station which is being converted into broad gauge. IIT Kanpur Flight lab Aerodrome is the nearest landing facility though not for public use.  Kanpur Airport is the nearest domestic airport while nearest international airport is at Lucknow.

Tourist attractions

The major tourist attractions are:-

Blue World Theme Park 
Gausiya Jama Masjid
Awadh Villa Resort
KD Resorts
Banarsi Farms
Seven Heavens
Bankhandeshwar Temple , Bithoor road
Iscon Temple
JK temple (a famous Radha Krishna Temple)
Moti jheel
Nanarao Park

References

Cities and towns in Kanpur Dehat district